Conference for Open Source Coders, Users and Promoters (COSCUP) is an annual conference held by Taiwanese Open source community participants since 2006. It's a major force of Free software movement advocacy in Taiwan. The event is often held in two days, with talks, sponsor and communities booths, and Birds of a feather (computing). In addition to international speakers, many Taiwanese local Open Source contributors often give their talks here. The chief organizer, other staffs, and speakers are all volunteers.

COSCUP's aim is to provide a platform to connect Open Source coders, users, and promoters, and promote FLOSS with the annual conference. The conference is free to attend because of the enthusiastic sponsors and donators. Since the conference venue is limited, tickets are often sold out immediately after the online registration starts.

The lightweight Desktop Environment LXDE was announced at COSCUP 2006.

History 
COSCUP's predecessor was the community talks in International Conference on Open Source (ICOS). In 2006, ICOS's topics no longer fit some attendees' demand; Taiwanese Open source community participators initiated COSCUP, as a "festival" for Taiwanese open source communities. The first event, COSCUP 2006, was held at National Taiwan University Sports Center, and was a great success with almost 200 attendees. The number of attendees grew to almost 2000 by COSCUP 2014.

In 2014,  COSCUP moved to Taipei International Convention Center, with 1,500 attendees, and 110 talks. Later in 2014, COSCUP was back to Academia Sinica Humanities and Social Sciences Building, but the conference also extends to the neighboring Academia Sinica Academic Activities Center. This was the first time COSCUP was held in two venues simultaneously.

Registration 
COSCUP's registration set records in 2010, 2011, and 2012, as the server crashed within minutes after registrations began, the registration process is often done after hours, due to heavy server load. In COSCUP 2013, the conference started to use Registrano for registration. The system successfully sustained the heavy load of the registrations, this also led to the later success with KKTIX with COSCUP 2014.

See also 
List of free-software events

References

External links 

COSCUP
COSCUP 2006 Oct. 28 2006
COSCUP 2007 Nov. 3-4 2007
COSCUP 2008 Aug. 23-24 2008
COSCUP 2009 Aug. 15-16 2009
COSCUP 2010 Aug. 14-15 2010
COSCUP 2011 Aug. 20-21 2011
COSCUP 2012 Aug. 18-19 2012
COSCUP 2013 Aug. 03-04 2013
投影片：打不倒的報名網站 2013 COSCUP 版
COSCUP 2014 Jul. 19-20 2014
COSCUP 2015 Aug. 15-16 2015

2006 establishments in Taiwan
Free software
International conferences
Free-software conferences
Annual events in Taiwan
Summer events in Taiwan